Aleksei Sergeyevich Podprugin (born 2 April 1988) is a Russian professional football player. He plays for FC Dynamo Vladivostok.

Club career
He played in the Russian Football National League for FC Chita in 2009.

External links
 
 

1988 births
People from Ust-Ilimsk
Living people
Russian footballers
Association football defenders
FC Altai Semey players
Russian expatriate footballers
Expatriate footballers in Kazakhstan
FC Chita players
Sportspeople from Irkutsk Oblast